Ilda Mujović (born 2 May 1993) is a Montenegrin footballer.

Career
Mujović started her career with ESV Merseburg, and later played for Sporting Mücheln, along with her sister Maida. In the summer of 2007, Mujović transferred to German Regionalliga team Magdeburger FFC, where she again played with her sister. In 2012, Mujović transferred to SV Eintracht Bad Dürrenberg.

International career
In May 2012, Mujović made her debut for Montenegro in a friendly against Albania. She scored a goal on debut.

Family
Mujović's sister Maida Markgraf ( Mujović) has also played for the Montenegrin national team.

References

1993 births
Living people
Women's association football midfielders
Montenegrin women's footballers
People from Bijelo Polje
Montenegro women's international footballers